Lee Antony Noble is a British entrepreneur, car designer and engineer. He is the founder of the sports car companies Noble Automotive Ltd in 1999 and Fenix Automotive in 2009. He is also the designer of some low-volume sports cars, including the Ultima Mk1, Ultima Mk2, Ultima Mk3, Midtec Spyder and Ascari FGT.

Noble's designs have also been further developed beyond Noble's involvement, resulting in successful designs such as the Ultima GTR, Ascari Ecosse, Noble M400, Noble M600, Rossion Q1 and designs such as the Salica GT, which was never made. His style for sports cars is to start with a lightweight space frame, have a big powerful engine and an aerodynamic sports-racer body. Almost all the cars Noble has designed have been mid-engined.

Noble started Noble Automotive after he finished his involvement with Ascari, a manufacturer of supercars with a high price and small market. Lee Noble wanted to produce cheaper cars, so Noble Automotive set out to build a relatively affordable, fast car. To sell hundreds or thousands of cars per year, build costs need to be low and quality needs to be high. Noble does much of its basic manufacturing in South Africa. The core body/chassis assemblies are shipped from South Africa to England, where Noble installs the drivetrain, for the European market, and performs final tests.

Lee Noble left Noble Automotive in the spring of 2008 and created a new company Fenix Automotive in late 2009, which was subsequently dissolved in late 2012. Noble was involved in the design of the Arrinera Hussarya supercar that will be produced in Poland.

Cars developed under Noble 
 (1983) Ultima Mk1
 (1984) Ultima MK 2
 (1986) Ferrari P4 replica
 (1987) Lotus 23 replica
 (1989) Ultima MK 3
 (1989) Prosport LM 3000
 (1991) Midtec Spyder
 (1995) Prosport spyder
 (1996) Ascari FGT
 (1999) Noble M10
 (2000) Noble M12 GTO
 (2002) Noble M12 GTO-3
 (2003) Noble M12 GTO-3R
 (2005) Noble M400
 (2006) Noble M15
 (2009) Noble M600
 (2011) Fenix GT
 (2013) Arrinera Hussarya

References

British founders of automobile manufacturers
Year of birth missing (living people)
Living people